The governor of the Autonomous Region in Muslim Mindanao was the executive head of the Autonomous Region in Muslim Mindanao (ARMM) in the Philippines. The position was also simply referred to as the regional governor (punong pangrehiyon) as a distinction to provincial governors.

The following is a list of holders of the position.

List of governors

Notes

References

Autonomous Region in Muslim Mindanao
ARMM
Defunct government positions in the Philippines